Swail is a surname. Notable people with the name include:

 Doug Swail (born c. 1930), Canadian football player
 Joe Swail (born 1969), Northern Irish snooker player 
 Julie Swail (born 1972), American Water Polo player

See also
 Swale (disambiguation)
 Swails, surname